In the sport of baseball, a doubleheader is a set of two games played between the same two teams on the same day. Historically, doubleheaders have been played in immediate succession, in front of the same crowd. Contemporarily, the term is also used to refer to two games played between two teams in a single day in front of different crowds and not in immediate succession.

For many decades, doubleheaders in Major League Baseball (MLB) were routinely scheduled numerous times each season. However, today a doubleheader is generally the result of a prior game between the same two teams being postponed due to inclement weather or other factors. Most often the game is rescheduled for a day on which the two teams play each other again. Often it is within the same series, but in some cases, may be weeks or months after the original date. On rare occasions, the last game between two teams in that particular city is rained out, and a doubleheader may be scheduled at the other team's home park to replace the missed game.

Currently, major league teams playing two games in a day usually play a "day-night doubleheader", in which the stadium is emptied of spectators and a separate admission is required for the second game.  However, such games are officially regarded as separate games on the same date, rather than as a doubleheader. True doubleheaders are less commonly played. Classic doubleheaders, also known as day doubleheaders, were more common in the past, and although they are rare in the major leagues, they still are played at the minor league and college levels.

In 1959, at least one league played a quarter of its games as classic doubleheaders. The rate declined to 10% in 1979. Eventually, eight years passed between two officially scheduled doubleheaders. Reasons for the decline include clubs' desire to maximize revenue, longer duration of games, five-day pitching rotation as opposed to four-day rotation, time management of relievers and catchers, and lack of consensus among players.

The record for the most doubleheaders played by a team in a season is 44 by the Chicago White Sox in 1943. Between September 4 and September 15, 1928, the Boston Braves played nine consecutive doubleheaders – 18 games in 12 days.

Twi-night
In a twi-night (short for "twilight-night") doubleheader, the first game is played in the late afternoon; after the first game ends,  a break of 20 to 30 minutes occurs, after which the second game is played. A spectator may attend both games by purchasing a single ticket. Under the Collective Bargaining Agreement, this is allowed provided the start time of the first game is no later than 5:00 p.m. local time, although they generally start at 4:00 p.m. For statistical purposes, the attendance is counted only for the second game, with the first game's attendance recorded as zero. This type of doubleheader is more common in Minor League Baseball as the result of rainouts. They are also played in Major League cities with open-air ballparks and climates that are too extreme for day games.

Classic
The "classic" doubleheader is like the twi-night doubleheader except the first game is played in the early afternoon and the second in the late afternoon. This was often done out of necessity in the years before many ballparks had lights; often, if either game went into extra innings, the second game was eventually called when it grew dark. However, it is presently less common in the major leagues, even for rain makeups, since the use of lights in baseball stadiums allows most games to be scheduled for the night. Like the twi-night doubleheader, this type of doubleheader is more prominent in the minor leagues.  On June 10, 2017, the Tampa Bay Rays and Oakland Athletics played a scheduled single-admission day-day doubleheader in St. Petersburg.

Day-night
In a "day-night doubleheader", the first game is played in the early afternoon and the second is played at night; in this scenario, spectators must buy separate tickets to gain admittance to both games. Except in special circumstances by the approval of the Major League Baseball Players Association (MLBPA), such as a makeup game resulting from a rain-out, this is prohibited under the terms of the 2002 Collective Bargaining Agreement (CBA). On August 22, 2012, the Miami Marlins played a day-night doubleheader at the Arizona Diamondbacks due to a scheduling error violating another section of the CBA, which prohibits 23 consecutive games without a day off.  The Elias Sports Bureau does not include this as a doubleheader for the sake of record books, nor do the official playing rules recognize such games as official doubleheaders. However, they are favored by MLB clubs because they can realize revenue from gate receipts for two games.

Tripleheaders

Three instances of a tripleheader are recorded in MLB, indicating three games between the same two teams on the same day. These occurred between the Brooklyn Bridegrooms and Pittsburgh Innocents on September 1, 1890 (Brooklyn won all three); between the Baltimore Orioles and Louisville Colonels on September 7, 1896 (Baltimore won all three); and between the Pittsburgh Pirates and Cincinnati Reds on October 2, 1920 (Cincinnati won two of the three). 

Tripleheaders are prohibited under the current CBA, except if the first game is the conclusion of a game suspended from a prior date: this would only happen in the extremely rare event when the only remaining dates between teams are doubleheaders, and no single games are left for the suspended game to precede.

Seven-inning doubleheaders
Under some rulesets, games played as part of a doubleheader last seven innings each instead of the usual nine.

In college and minor league baseball
College and minor league baseball typically use seven-inning doubleheaders. This applies even in the postseason; in 1994, the first game of the five-game Pacific Coast League championship series between Vancouver and Albuquerque was rained out; the two teams played a doubleheader, seven innings each, on the originally scheduled date of the second game. In the minors, if the first game is the completion of a suspended game from a prior day, the suspended game is played to completion (seven or nine innings, whichever it was scheduled to be when it started), and the second game of the doubleheader is seven innings.

In leagues which place a runner on second base at the start of extra innings, the rule applies starting in the eighth inning.

In Major League Baseball, 2020–2021
After the COVID-19 pandemic delayed the start of the 2020 MLB season to July from its original intended start in March, Major League Baseball announced on July 31 that all doubleheader games starting August 1 would last seven innings each during the shortened season, to reduce strain on teams' pitchers. The league and the MLBPA came to an agreement to put this rule in place only for the 2020 season, later extended to the 2021 season as well. The 2022 season reverted to nine-inning doubleheaders, as COVID-19 was no longer a concern.

Prior to the passage of this rule change, one conventional double-header with nine innings each had been played on July 28 between the Cleveland Indians and the Chicago White Sox. On August 2, the first seven-inning doubleheader happened between the Cincinnati Reds and the Detroit Tigers at Comerica Park, with the Reds winning both games.

Statistical impact
Some feats that could be done in a seven-inning game would be counted as is, while others would require extra innings, such as a shutout credit being applied if done so in a seven-inning game, while a no-hitter would only be counted if the game went at least nine innings. Reds pitcher Trevor Bauer threw the first complete seven-inning shutout in the second game under the rule.

Additionally, under the 1991 guidelines constituting officially recognized no-hitters, any no-hitter thrown during a seven-inning game would not count as an official no-hitter. On April 25, 2021 Madison Bumgarner of the Arizona Diamondbacks pitched a complete seven-inning game allowing no hits to the Atlanta Braves in the second game of a doubleheader, but did not receive credit for a no-hitter.

Doubleheaders of note

The home-and-home doubleheader, in which each team hosts one game, is extremely rare, as it requires the teams' home ballparks to be in close geographical proximity. During the 20th century and before the advent of interleague play in 1997, only one instance was recorded in Major League Baseball: a Labor Day special event involving the New York Giants and Brooklyn Superbas.

 September 7, 1903
 Game 1: Washington Park (II): Giants 6, Superbas 4
 Game 2: Polo Grounds (III): Superbas 3, Giants 0

This is the only home-and-home doubleheader known to have been part of the original major league season schedule.

Since interleague play began, the New York Mets and the New York Yankees have on three occasions played home-and-home doubleheaders. Each occasion was due to a rainout during the first series of the season.  During the second series of the season, a makeup game was scheduled at the ballpark of the opposing team as part of a day-night doubleheader.

 July 8, 2000
 Game 1: Shea Stadium: Yankees 4, Mets 2
 Game 2: Yankee Stadium (I): Yankees 4, Mets 2 (June 11 makeup)
 June 28, 2003
 Game 1: Yankee Stadium (I): Yankees 7, Mets 1
 Game 2: Shea Stadium: Yankees 9, Mets 8 (June 21 makeup)
 June 27, 2008
 Game 1: Yankee Stadium (I): Mets 15, Yankees 6 (May 16 makeup)
 Game 2: Shea Stadium: Yankees 9, Mets 0

On September 13, 1951, the St. Louis Cardinals hosted a doubleheader against two different teams. The first game was a 6–4 win against the New York Giants. The second game resulted in a 2–0 loss to the Boston Braves. 
 
On September 25, 2000, the Cleveland Indians also hosted a doubleheader against two different teams. The September 10 game against the Chicago White Sox in Cleveland had been rained out.  With no common days off for the remainder of the season and both teams in a postseason race, the teams agreed to play a day game in Cleveland on the same day that the Indians were to host the Minnesota Twins for a night game.  The Indians defeated the White Sox 9–2 in the first game, while the Twins defeated the Indians 4–3 in the second.

On occasion, teams may play both games of a doubleheader at the same park, but one team is designated home for each game. This is usually the result of earlier postponements. For example, in 2007, when snow storms in northern Ohio caused the Cleveland Indians to postpone an entire four-game series from April 5–8 against the Seattle Mariners; three of the games were made up in Cleveland throughout the season, while the fourth was made up as part of a doubleheader in Seattle on September 26 with the Indians as the designated home team for the first game. The Indians won the first game acting as the home team, 12–4, but lost the second as the away team, 3–2.

In popular culture
National Baseball Hall of Fame inductee Ernie Banks, who spent his entire MLB career with the Chicago Cubs, was known for his catchphrase, "It's a beautiful day for a ballgame ... Let's play two!", expressing his wish to play a doubleheader every day out of his love of baseball.

References

Baseball terminology
Sports television